Wiessner is a surname. Notable people with the surname include:

Fritz Wiessner (1900–1988), German-American pioneer of free climbing
Pauline Wiessner (born 1947), American anthropologist
Siegfried Wiessner (born 1953), American law professor

See also
Wiesner